Daniel Guadalupe Amador Osuna (born 22 March 1997) is a Mexican professional footballer who plays as an attacking midfielder.

External links

Living people
1997 births
Association football midfielders
Leones Negros UdeG footballers
Correcaminos UAT footballers
Ascenso MX players
Liga Premier de México players
Tercera División de México players
Footballers from Baja California Sur
Mexican footballers
People from Comondú Municipality